Sarcey may refer to two communes in France:
Sarcey, Haute-Marne, in the Grand Est region
Sarcey, Rhône, in the Auvergne-Rhône-Alpes region